Yunus Emre also known as Derviş Yunus (Yunus the Dervish) (1238–1328) (Old Anatolian Turkish: يونس امره)
was a Turkish folk poet and Islamic Sufi mystic who greatly influenced Turkish culture. His name, Yunus, is the Turkish equivalent to the English name Jonah. He wrote in Old Anatolian Turkish, an early stage of Turkish. The UNESCO General Conference unanimously passed a resolution declaring 1991, the 750th anniversary of the poet's birth, International Yunus Emre Year.

Biography

Yunus Emre has exercised immense influence on Turkish literature from his own day until the present, because Yunus Emre is, after Ahmed Yesevi and Sultan Walad, one of the first known poets to have composed works in the spoken Turkish of his own age and region rather than in Persian or Arabic. His diction remains very close to the popular speech of the people in Central and Western Anatolia. This is also the language of a number of anonymous folk-poets, folk-songs, fairy tales, riddles (tekerlemeler), and proverbs.

Like the Oghuz Book of Dede Korkut, an older and anonymous Central Asian epic, the Turkish folklore that inspired Yunus Emre in his occasional use of tekerlemeler as a poetic device had been handed down orally to him and his contemporaries. This strictly oral tradition continued for a long while. Following the Mongolian invasion of Anatolia, facilitated by the Sultanate of Rûm's defeat at the 1243 Battle of Köse Dağ, Islamic mystic literature thrived in Anatolia; Yunus Emre became one of its most distinguished poets. The poetry of Yunus Emre — despite being fairly simple on the surface — evidences his skill in describing quite abstruse mystical concepts in a clear way. He remains a popular figure in a number of countries, stretching from Azerbaijan to the Balkans, with seven different and widely dispersed localities disputing the privilege of having his tomb within their boundaries. Yunus Emre's most important book is Risaletu’n Nushiyye.

His poems, written in the tradition of Anatolian folk poetry, mainly concern divine love as well as human destiny:

and
Araya araya bulsam izini
İzinin tozuna sürsem yüzümü
Hak nasip eylese, görsem yüzünü
Ya Muhammed canım arzular seni

Bir mübarek sefer olsa da gitsem
Kâbe yollarında kumlara batsam
Mâh cemalin bir kez düşte seyretsem
Ya Muhammed canım pek sever seni

Ali ile Hasan-Hüseyin anda
Sevgisi gönülde, muhabbet canda
Yarın mahşer günü hak divanında
Ya Muhammed canım pek sever seni

"Yunus" senin medhin eder dillerde
Dillerde, dillerde, hem gönüllerde
Arayı arayı gurbet illerde
Ya Muhammed canım arzular seni

(Poem about Muhammad, Ali, Hassan and Hussein.)

In popular culture
Yunus Emre was the focus of Yunus Emre: Askin Yolculugu, a two-season 44-episode fictional drama based on the his life, premiering in 2015 on Turkish National Television (TRT), created by Mehmet Bozdağ, and starring Gökhan Atalay as Yunus Emre. Yunus Emre has also been the focus of a film and a song; his representations in popular culture include:
 Yunus Emre: Askin Yolculugu - A two-season 44-episode fictional drama based on the life of Yunus Emre, premiering in 2015 on Turkish National Television (TRT).
 Yunus Emre: Aşkın Sesi - A 2014 Turkish film based on Yunus Emre's life starring Devrim Evin in the lead role.
 Adımız Miskindir Bizim - A 1973 psychedelic folk-rock song by Mazhar ve Fuat, with lyrics belongs to Yunus Emre.

Gallery

See also
 Sufism
 Karacaoğlan
 Anthologies
 Yunus Emre Institute

References

Sources

External links

 Turkish television series (2015-), episode list at IMDB: Season 1, episodes 1-22 & Season 2, episodes 1-22, 23
 Yunus Emre's Humanism
 Yunus Emre & Humanism (short)
 Mystical Poetry Of Yunus Emre
 

Turkish poets
1240 births
1321 deaths
Date of birth unknown
Turkish-language writers
Turkish Sufis
Sufi poets